Dominic Ivan Pressley (May 30, 1964 – 1997) was an American professional basketball player. He was a point guard who played one season in the National Basketball Association (NBA) as a member of the Washington Bullets and the Chicago Bulls (1988–89). He attended Boston College where he was selected by the Seattle SuperSonics during the fifth round of the 1986 NBA draft, but he was released before playing for them.

Pressley died due to cancer in 1997.

References

External links

1964 births
1997 deaths
Date of death missing
Albany Patroons players
American men's basketball players
Basketball players from Washington, D.C.
Boston College Eagles men's basketball players
Chicago Bulls players
Grand Rapids Hoops players
Point guards
Rockford Lightning players
San Jose Jammers players
Savannah Spirits players
Seattle SuperSonics draft picks
Tulsa Fast Breakers players
Washington Bullets players